"Death to My Hometown" is a song written and recorded by American musician Bruce Springsteen and was the third single from his album, Wrecking Ball. It is a protest song, as well a prominent example of Springsteen's experimentation with Celtic rock rhythms.

A music video for the song was released through Springsteen's website on April 13, 2012, and was compiled from live performances and rehearsals at the Apollo Theater, Atlanta, and SXSW featuring Tom Morello.

History
"Death to My Hometown" became a staple of the Wrecking Ball Tour, usually being played towards the beginning of the sets. The tin whistle riff from the album version was handed over to the newly assembled 5-piece horn section during the shows. The song has been played at every Wrecking Ball show as of June 11, 2012.

Themes
The song is an allegorical protest song concerning the causes and fallout of the financial crisis of 2007–2008. Springsteen uses archaic imagery to show how "death" came to his hometown not by war, but by allegedly reckless economic practices. He also references the supposed lack of accountability for the practices by bankers that allegedly led to the crisis. "The greedy thieves who came around/And ate the flesh of everything they found/Whose crimes have gone unpunished now/Who walk the streets as free men now," he sings.

The album version of the song contains a sample of "The Last Words of Copernicus", a hymn by Sarah Lancaster on the subject of death from The Sacred Harp, recorded by Alan Lomax in 1959.

Personnel
Bruce Springsteen – lead vocal, guitar
Ron Aniello – bass guitar, keyboards, loops, backing vocals
Art Baron – euphonium, tuba
Kevin Buell – drums and backing vocals 
Matt Chamberlain – drums and percussion
Charlie Giordano - organ 
Rob LeBret - backing vocals
Clif Norrell - backing vocals
Ross Petersen – backing vocals 
Soozie Tyrell – violin

References

External links
 Brucespringsteen.net

2012 songs
Bruce Springsteen songs
Songs written by Bruce Springsteen
Columbia Records singles
2012 singles
Song recordings produced by Ron Aniello
Song recordings produced by Bruce Springsteen
Protest songs